Inside is the fourteenth studio album by American country music artist Ronnie Milsap, released in 1982 by RCA Records. It contains the hits "Any Day Now", "Inside", and "He Got You".

Track listing

Production
Produced By Tom Collins & Ronnie Milsap
Engineers: Bill Harris, Les Ladd
Assistant Engineer: Ben Harris

Personnel
Drums: Alan Kerr, Larrie Londin, Buster Phillips
Percussion: Farrell Morris
Bass: Warren Gowers
Keyboards: Shane Keister, Ronnie Milsap, Richard Ripani
Guitars: Peter Bordonali, Jimmy Capps, Bruce Dees, Dennis Morgan, Jack Watkins
Pedal Steel: Russ Hicks, John Hughey
Mandolin: Peter Bordonali
Harmonica: Charlie McCoy
Backing Vocals: Tom Brannan, Sherilyn Huffman, Lisa Silver, Suzy Storm, Diane Tidwell, Marie Tomlinson, Barbara Wyrick
Strings: Nashville String Machine; Arranged By D. Bergen White

Charts

Weekly charts

Year-end charts

References

Ronnie Milsap albums
1982 albums
RCA Records albums
Albums produced by Tom Collins (record producer)